Lastheneia (or Lasthenia) of Mantinea was one of Plato's female students.

She was born in Mantinea, an ancient city in Arcadia, in the Peloponnese. She studied in the Academy of Plato dressed as a man. After the death of Plato she continued her studies with Speusippus, Plato's nephew. She is also said to have had a relationship with Speusippus.

A papyrus fragment from Oxyrhynchus mentions an unidentified woman who studied under Plato, Speusippus, and then Menedemus of Eretria. The fragment goes on to explain that "in her teens she was lovely and full of unstudied grace." This woman is probably Lastheneia or Axiothea of Phlius.

References

4th-century BC Greek people
4th-century BC philosophers
Ancient Athenian women
Ancient Greek women philosophers
Academic philosophers
Ancient Mantineans
Female-to-male cross-dressers
Year of birth unknown
Year of death unknown
4th-century BC Greek women